Out of Silence is the third studio album by Greek keyboardist and composer Yanni, released by Private Music in 1987. Its corresponding concert tour was the 1987 Concert Series.

The liner notes dedicate the album to his homeland in Kalamata, Greece respectively: "Dedicated to the town of Kalamata, Greece which stood strong and waited for me one last time."

The album was reissued in 2009 by Valley Entertainment.

Album

Critical reception

In a review by William Ruhlmann of AllMusic, "Yanni's second album, like his first (Keys to Imagination), was recorded entirety on synthesizers at his home studio. The composer/performer makes extensive use of the orchestral possibilities of electronics, creating big themes to play across elaborate, echoing rhythm tracks. Unlike much adult alternative music, it's constantly stimulating foreground music with an extremely modern sound."

Track listing

Personnel
All music composed and produced by Yanni
Acoustic, Electronic Drums and Percussions: Charlie Adams

Production
Out of Silence was recorded in its entirety on keyboards at Yanni's home studio.
Engineer: Jerry Steckling
Mastered at Bernie Grundman Mastering (Los Angeles by Bernie Grundman)
Photo-Illustration: Stafford/Wehlacz for Prima Vista Studios.
Hair and Make-Up: Annette Zeglen
Producer: Peter Baumann

1987 Concert Series

Dates
1987

Cities

Set list
Selections from Keys to Imagination and Out of Silence

The band
It was during this year that Yanni was putting together his first touring band to promote his album Out of Silence, as well as selections from Keys to Imagination. "Although I'd written, as always, with an orchestra in mind, I couldn't afford one, so I reproduced that sound in my studio with my synthesizers. But because I wanted to play everything live onstage, and not against tape, I needed three keyboard players and a drummer on the road", says Yanni. This first live band included Joyce Imbesi and John Tesh on keyboards, and Charlie Adams on drums.

Band
Charlie Adams – drums
John Tesh – keyboards
Joyce Imbesi – keyboards

References

External links
Official Website

1987 albums
Yanni albums